Dom sportova, is a multi-purpose indoor sports arena located in Zagreb, Croatia. The venue was built in 1972 on Trešnjevka, in the western part of the city. It has 32,000 m2 of floorspace, and it features six halls. The seating capacity of the biggest two halls is 5,000 and 3,100. It is used for basketball, handball, volleyball, ice hockey, gymnastics, tennis, as well as concerts.

It is the venue for the PBZ Zagreb Indoors men's tennis tournament. It also hosted the final tournament of the 1989 European Basketball Championship, in which the home team of Yugoslavia won the gold medal, the 2000 European Men's Handball Championship, the 2003 World Women's Handball Championship, the 2005 Women's European Volleyball Championship as well as the 2008 and 2013 European Figure Skating Championships.

Concerts

In 40 years the venue hosted many foreign and domestic concerts from celebrated artists, some of them include:
 Santana performed a show during their Borboletta Tour on 4 October 1975 and their Dance of the Rainbow Serpent Tour on 19 October 1998
 Paul McCartney and Wings performed during their Wings Over Europe tour on 21 September 1976
 Rolling Stones performed during their tour of Europe on 21 and 22 June 1976
 Queen performed during their Jazz Tour on 6 February 1979
 Motörhead had a concert. 4. September 1982.
 Wishbone Ash performed the concert in the venue. 21. October 1982.
 Eric Burdon and The Animals performed a concert.  1984.
 Elton John performed as part of his European Express Tour 19. April 1984.
 Rory Gallagher performed the venue on 15. January 1985.
 Dire Straits performed a concert as part of Brothers in Arms Tour 12. May 1985.
 Eddy Grant performed the venue on 17. December 1985.
 Iron Maiden held a concert during their Somewhere on Tour 11. September 1986.
 Nazareth & Girl School, played the venue on 2. December 1986.
 Samantha Fox performed a small gig on 13. April 1988.
 Motörhead had a concert as a part of their March ör Die Tour. 24. March 1990.
 Alice Cooper had a concert during his Trashes the World Tour. 17. July 1990.
 Ramones held a concert here. 24. November 1990.
 Scorpions had a concert, as the part of their Crazy World Tour 2. December 1990.
 Deep Purple performed the concert in the venue during their Slaves and Masters Tour. 31. January 1991.
 Judas Priest performed the concert in the venue during their Operation Rock 'N' Roll Tour. 26. February 1991.
 Pet Shop Boys performed as part of their Performance Tour 14. May 1991.
 Ramones performed a concert featuring a local band Hladno pivo. 11. October 1994.
 Mišo Kovač performed a concert. 1996.
 Crvena jabuka performed a concert.  4. December 1996.
 David Bowie performed a concert during his Earthling Tour. 1. July 1997.
 The Kelly Family performed a concert.  27. December 1997.
 Jimmy Page & Robert Plant performed a concert during their Page/Plant – Europe Spring Tour. 21. February 1998.
 Doris Dragović held a self birthday concert, titled "Rođendan u Zagrebu". 28. Januar 2001.
 Duran Duran performed a concert during the band's The Up Close and Personal Tour on 3. November 2001.
 Depeche Mode performed a sold-out concert during the band's Exciter Tour on 3. November 2001.
 Severina Vučković performed a sold-out concert titled "Virujen u te", promoting her album Pogled ispod obrva 13. December 2001.
 Enrique Iglesias held a concert as the part of his "One Night Stand Tour", 14. June 2002.
 Goran Bregović performed a concert with his Wedding & Funeral Band.  28. October 2002.
 Zlatan Stipišić Gibonni performed a sold-out concert titled 'Zagrebački Mirakul Live' to promote Mirakul (Gibonni) album.  12. February 2003.
 Placebo held a concert in the venue, in order to promote band's Sleeping with Ghosts album on 1. September 2003.
 Đorđe Balašević held a New Year's concert. 27. December 2003.
 Oliver Dragojević performed two back to back sold-out concerts on 6. & 7. February 2004.
 Santana performed a concert during his European Tour 20. July 2004.
 Prljavo kazalište performed a sold-out concert, titled "Heroj ulice". 2004.
 R.E.M. performed a concert as the part of their European Winter Tour. 19. January 2005.
 Nina Badrić performed a Valentine's Day's concert titled "Ljubav za ljubav", promoting her album Ljubav on 14 February 2005.
 Faithless, Thievery Corporation, Gus Gus and X-Press 2 played at the Zagreb Groove Festival on 27 May 2005.
 Miroslav Škoro had a concert, promoting his album Svetinja 2005.
 The Prodigy held a concert, promoting the album Always Outnumbered, Never Outgunned on Their Law: The Singles 1990–2005 Tour.  6. October 2005.
 Novi fosili performed a reunion concert titled "Za dobra stara vremena", 14. October 2005.
 Phil Collins performed a concert during his "First Final Farewell Tour" 27. October 2005.
 Humanitarni koncert "Zajedno" performed by: Dražen Zečić, Baruni, Mate Bulić, Marko Perković Thompson, Miroslav Škoro.  21. February 2006.
 Pearl Jam held a concert on 26 September 2006.
 50 Cent performed during his European Tour, promoting Curtis 3. December 2007.
 Bijelo Dugme performed one of many reunion concerts. 19. December 2007.
 Alicia Keys performed as part of her As I Am Tour 10. October 2008.
 Massive Attack performed a sold-out concert on 6. November 2009. 
 Deep Purple performed the concert in the venue during their Rapture of the Deep tour. 5. June 2010.
 Tomislav Bralić i Klapa Intrade performed the concert along with Klapa Cambi and other guests in the venue. 5. June 2010.
 Zvijezde Hit Recordsa all star, record company concert, Including: Jelena Rozga, Halid Bešlić, Josip Čagalj Jole, Jasmin Stavros, Sandi Cenov, Kaliopi, Magazin, Amir Kazić Leo, Alka Vuica, Neda Ukraden, Maja Šuput, Ivan Zak, Zlatko Pejaković, Baruni. 20. December 2010.
 The Beat Fleet (TBF) performed the concert in the venue. 12. November 2011.
 Zvijezde Hit Recordsa all star, record company concert. Including: Jelena Rozga, Halid Bešlić, Neda Ukraden, Maja Šuput, Ivan Zak, Zlatko Pejaković.  21. December 2011.
 Zaz (singer) had a sold-out concert during her "Live Tour 2012". 3. June 2012.
 Brit Floyd held a Pink Floyd tribute show during their A Foot in The Door World Tour 2012. 8. November 2012.
 Hladno Pivo, Let 3, Brkovi, One Piece Puzzle held a concert titled "Pozitivan koncert 2012" 1. December 2012.
 Gazde held a concert.  11. December 2012.
 Zvijezde Hit Recordsa all star, record company concert, Including: Jelena Rozga, Halid Bešlić, Josip Čagalj Jole, Jasmin Stavros, Sandi Cenov, Kaliopi, Magazin, Amir Kazić Leo, Alka Vuica, Neda Ukraden, Maja Šuput, Ivan Zak, Zlatko Pejaković, Baruni, Tamburaši. 20. December 2012.
 Parni Valjak performed the unplugged concert "Bez struje" 23. March 2013.
 Gregorian performed a show as part of their The World Epic Chants Tour 3. April 2013.
 Whitesnake performed as part of their Year of the Snake Tour 15. June 2013.
 Dubioza kolektiv performed in the venue, promoting the album Apsurdistan on 26. October 2013.
 Marko Perković Thompson performed a concert during his Ora et labora tour on 16. November 2013.
 Massimo Savić performed the Valentine's Day concert on 14. February 2014
 Simple Minds performed during their Greatest Hits Tour 2014 on 4. March 2014

See also
 List of tennis stadiums by capacity
 List of indoor arenas in Croatia
 List of indoor arenas in Europe

References

External links
Official Site

Buildings and structures completed in 1972
Indoor arenas in Croatia
Basketball venues in Croatia
Handball venues in Croatia
Indoor ice hockey venues in Croatia
Tennis venues in Croatia
Sports venues in Zagreb
Trešnjevka
KHL Medveščak Zagreb
Kontinental Hockey League venues